Roger Sloman (born 19 May 1946) is an English actor known for his work in theatre, film, and television.

Early life and education 
He grew up and was educated in South East London. He trained to be a teacher and then went to East 15 acting school between 1967 and 1970.

Career 
He started work at the Everyman Theatre in Liverpool, followed by spells in theatre in Nottingham, Birmingham and Sheffield. He toured England and Scotland with the 7:84 theatre company and the Royal Shakespeare Company.

On television, Sloman is best known as Keith in Mike Leigh's Nuts in May, as well as Baldy Davitt in Ripping Yarns, Three-Fingered Pete in The Black Adder and Right Bleedin' Bastard in The Young Ones. He was also known as Rocky Wesson in the return series of the ITV series Crossroads, and as the funeral director Les Coker in the BBC Series Eastenders. He played the abrasive games teacher Mr Dan 'Frosty' Foster in the first series of Grange Hill (1978) and he appeared in one edition of Bad Boyes (1987). In 1989, he appeared in the first episode of Press Gang as Mr. Vader. In 1991 and 1992, he played The landlord "Mr Harrison" opposite Rik Mayall and Adrian Edmondson in the Bottom episodes "Up" and "Holy".

His film appearances include Lenin in Reds, by Warren Beatty.

Sloman has worked many times at The National Theatre in London playing, amongst others, Bardolph in Henry IV. Also appeared as Magwitch in Great Expectations at the Royal Shakespeare Company in Stratford-upon-Avon.

Personal life 
He has three children.

Filmography

Film

Television

References

External links
 

1946 births
Living people
Male actors from London
English male film actors
English male soap opera actors
People from Harlesden